Diego de Muros may refer to: 

Diego de Muros (bishop of Ciudad Rodrigo) (1405–1492), Spanish Roman Catholic bishop
Diego de Muros (Bishop of Islas Canarias) (died 1507), Spanish Roman Catholic bishop 
Diego de Muros (bishop of Oviedo) (died 1525), Spanish Roman Catholic bishop